The Oaxacan coral snake (Micrurus ephippifer) is a species of elapid snake, endemic to Mexico. There are two recognized subspecies.

Distribution and habitat 
M. ephippifer occurs in tropical deciduous forest and pine-oak forest from near sea level to over 2,300 m asl on the Pacific versant of Oaxaca, from Central Oaxaca to the lowlands and foothills of the Isthmus of Tehuantepec.

Subspecies 
There are currently two recognized subspecies:
 Micrurus ephippifer ephippifer (Cope, 1886)
 ''Micrurus ephippifer zapotectus Roze, 1989

References 

Micrurus
Reptiles described in 1886
Endemic reptiles of Mexico
Fauna of the Sierra Madre del Sur
Fauna of the Southern Pacific dry forests